Leroy Sibbles (born Leroy Sibblies, 29 January 1949) is a Jamaican reggae musician and producer. He was the lead singer for The Heptones in the 1960s and 1970s.

In addition to his work with The Heptones, Sibbles was a session bassist and arranger at Clement "Coxsone" Dodd's Jamaica Recording and Publishing Studio and the associated Studio One label during the prolific late 1960s. He was described as "the greatest all-round talent in reggae history" by Kevin O'Brien Chang and Wayne Chen in their 1998 book Reggae Routes.

Biography
The son of a grocer, Sibbles began singing in the 1950s and also played guitar, having been taught by Trench Town Rastas Brother Huntley and "Carrot". Barry Llewellyn and Earl Morgan had formed The Heptones in 1958, and Sibbles was in a rival group along with two friends. Sibbles joined The Heptones in 1965 after the two groups competed in a street-corner contest.

The trio made their first recordings for Ken Lack in 1966 with "School Girls" and "Gun Man Coming to Town", the latter the A-side of their début single. Though the songs did not achieve hit status, the latter composition made the playlists at Radio Jamaica Rediffusion (RJR). They moved on to Clement "Coxsone" Dodd's Studio One where they stayed until 1971.

The Heptones were among the most influential groups of the rock steady era, along with The Pioneers, The Gaylads, The Paragons, The Uniques, and The Techniques. Signature Heptones songs included "Baby", "Get in the Groove", "Ting a Ling", "Fattie Fattie", "Got to Fight On (To the Top)", "Party Time", and "Sweet Talking". The group's Studio One output has been collected on albums The Heptones, On Top, Ting a Ling, Freedom Line, and the Heartbeat Records anthology, Sea of Love.

Studio One
Beyond his work as a singer-songwriter, Sibbles contributed to the collective output of Studio One as a bass player during the late 1960s. Keyboardist and arranger Jackie Mittoo encouraged Sibbles to play the bass when he needed a bassist for his Jazz trio.

When Mittoo left full-time duties at Studio One, Sibbles auditioned singers, arranged sessions, sang harmony, and played bass as a part of the studio group variously known as the Sound Dimension and Soul Vendors. These musicians, with engineering supervision Sylvan Morris, played backing tracks used by vocalists Bob Andy, Alton Ellis, Horace Andy, Carlton Manning, The Abyssinians, The Gladiators, Willi Williams, Ken Boothe, John Holt, Burning Spear, Dennis Brown, Slim Smith, and scores of others.

Sibbles was a contributor to tracks including "Freedom Blues" (which evolved into the Jamaican rhythm known as "MPLA") by Roy Richards, "Love Me Forever" by Carlton & The Shoes, "Satta Massagana" and "Declaration of Rights" by the Abyssinians, "Stars" and "Queen of the Minstrels" by The Eternals, "Ten to One" by the Mad Lads, "Door Peep (Shall Not Enter)" by Burning Spear, and the instrumental "Full Up", which was used by Musical Youth for their huge worldwide hit "Pass the Dutchie".

Because of the Jamaican process of versioning and the liberal recycling of rhythms in subsequent years, many of the songs, rhythms, and melodies written and recorded during the rocksteady era, the aforementioned in particular, continue to be referenced today. The most frequently referenced of Sibbles' bass lines is that found on the instrumental "Full Up", popularised internationally by Musical Youth's recording of "Pass the Dutchie", an adaptation of Mighty Diamonds' "Pass the Kouchie". Sibbles' legacy also endures in Horace Andy's tribute to him, "Mr. Bassie". (While Sibbles has been credited with the original "Real Rock" bassline, this was more likely performed by Boris Gardiner). The bass parts Sibbles and others developed in rocksteady used a rhythmic space found in later roots reggae, where the notes were not necessarily played or sustained on each downbeat of a 4/4 measure. Sibbles has explained that his style was to lag the downbeat slightly.

Other musicians involved in the Studio One rock steady sessions included Richard Ace and Robbie Lyn on keyboards; Bunny Williams, Joe Isaacs, and Fil Callendar on drums; Eric Frater and Ernest Ranglin on guitar; and the horn section of Felix "Deadly Headley" Bennett on saxophone and Vin Gordon (a.k.a. "Don D. Jr.") on trombone.

Work with other producers
After Studio One, Sibbles and the Heptones recorded for other producers including Lee Perry, Harry J, JoJo Hoo Kim, Niney The Observer, Clive Chin, Gussie Clarke, Lloyd Campbell, Prince Buster, Ossie Hibbert, Phil Pratt, Harry Mudie, Geoffrey Chung, Danny Holloway, Rupie Edwards, and Joe Gibbs.

Other Heptones releases from the early 1970s were Book of Rules (Trojan Records) and the Harry Johnson-produced album Cool Rasta (Trojan), recorded just before the group benefited from the internationalisation of reggae via Island Records. Danny Holloway produced Night Food and Lee "Scratch" Perry-produced Party Time were the fruit of the association with Island.

As a solo artist, Sibbles worked with Lloyd "Bullwackie" Barnes, Lloyd Parks, Sly & Robbie, Augustus Pablo, Bruce Cockburn, and Lee Perry, but primarily produced himself. Sibbles moved to Canada in 1973, where he married and remained for twenty years, and won a U-Know Award for best male vocalist in 1983, and a Juno Award for best reggae album in 1987. He left the Heptones in 1976, midway through a US tour. Also in Canada, he recorded an album for A&M and licensed several albums to Pete Weston's Micron label, including Now and Strictly Roots. In 1990 he collaborated on the one-off single "Can't Repress the Cause", a plea for greater inclusion of hip hop music in the Canadian music scene, with Dance Appeal, a supergroup of Toronto-area musicians that included Devon, Maestro Fresh Wes, Dream Warriors, B-Kool, Michie Mee, Lillian Allen, Eria Fachin, HDV, Dionne, Thando Hyman, Carla Marshall, Messenjah, Jillian Mendez, Lorraine Scott, Lorraine Segato, Self Defense, Zama and Thyron Lee White.

Sibbles continued to visit Jamaica, and performed at Reggae Sunsplash in 1980, 1981, 1983, 1986, and 1990. He returned to the Heptones in 1991. In 1996 he recorded "Original Full Up" with Beenie Man. Sibbles is featured in the 2009 documentary Rocksteady: The Roots of Reggae. He continued to perform and record into 2010.

Production work
Sibbles moved into production in 2009, and set up the Bright Beam record label. He has produced records by singer Sagitar and deejay Chapter, as well as his own recordings, including a successful cover version of "Harry Hippy".

Solo discography
Now (1980), Micron
Strictly Roots (1980), Micron
On Top (1982), Micron
The Champions Clash (1985), Kingdom – with Frankie Paul
Selections (1985), Leggo Sounds – also released as Mean While (1986), Attic
It's Not Over (1995), VP
Come Rock With Me (1999), Heartbeat
Reggae Hit Bass Lines (2009), Ernie B

Notes

References
Barrow, Steve & Dalton, Peter (2004), The Rough Guide to Reggae, 3rd edn., Rough Guides, 
Bradley, Lloyd (2000), This is Reggae Music: The Story of Jamaica's Music, Grove Press, 
Cooke, Mel (2006), "Voice, bass put Sibbles on top", Jamaica Gleaner, 3 February 2006, retrieved 2010-10-31
Katz, David (2000), People Funny Boy: The Genius of Lee "Scratch" Perry, Payback Press, 
Kenner, Rob (1997), "Boom Shots", Vibe, June–July 1997, p. 163
Keyes, Cheryl L. (2004), Rap Music and Street Consciousness, University of Illinois Press, 
O'Brien, Kevin & Chen, Wayne (1998), Reggae Routes: The Story of Jamaican Music, Ian Randle Publishers, 
Quill, Greg (2009), "Sibbles sees rocksteady revival", Jamaica Star, 25 July 2009, retrieved 2010-10-31
Thompson, Dave (2002), Reggae & Caribbean Music, Backbeat Books, 
Walker, Klive (2006), Dubwise: Reasoning from the Reggae Underground, Insomniac Press,

External links

Leroy Sibbles at Roots Archives

1949 births
20th-century Black Canadian male singers
Canadian reggae musicians
Jamaican reggae musicians
Jamaican emigrants to Canada
Living people
Trojan Records artists
Juno Award for Reggae Recording of the Year winners
20th-century Jamaican male singers
21st-century Jamaican male singers
21st-century Black Canadian male singers
VP Records artists
A&M Records artists